The Northeast Regional Ocean Council (NROC) is a state-federal partnership organization created to address issues related to the coast and ocean on a regional basis. The organization covers each state in New England which make up its membership. NROC was created in 2005 by the New England Governors Conference. Since 2008, NROC has participated in the National Oceanic and Atmospheric Administration's Coastal and Marine Spatial Planning initiative.

References

External links 

Oceanographic organizations
East Coast of the United States
Marine conservation organizations
United States interstate agencies
Environmental organizations established in 2005
2005 establishments in the United States